Adrian Hanlon (born 1980s) is an Irish Gaelic footballer who plays for West London GAA club St Clarets and also, formerly, for the Donegal county team.

He was a panel member when Donegal won the 2012 All-Ireland Senior Football Championship.

Biography
John Joe Doherty first invited Hanlon, a forward, to join the Donegal senior squad in 2009. That year he replaced Colm McFadden on McFadden's 100th championship appearance, which led to some controversy. Later that year he made a substitute appearance in the championship defeat to Cork at Croke Park, scoring a point.

Hanlon broke into the senior Donegal team during the 2011 National Football League and started the division 2 final against Laois. Donegal recorded victory, despite Adrian being sent off in the second half. He also played for Donegal in that year's championship opener against Antrim. Later dropped over a breach of discipline, Hanlon has since been included in senior Donegal squads again and was an unused substitute in the 2012 All Ireland victory over Mayo.

Hanlon played for Tír Chonaill Gaels between 2015 and 2017. He was the decider in the semi-final. His link-up with Killian Butler in the county semi-final 2017 was the decider between the sides.

As of 2021, Hanlon was playing for St Clarets of west London.

Honours
Donegal
 All-Ireland Senior Football Championship: 2012
 Ulster Senior Football Championship: 2011, 2012
 National Football League Division 2: 2011

Tír Chonaill Gaels
 London Senior Football Championship: 2015

References

External links
 Official profile

1980s births
Living people
An Clochán Liath Gaelic footballers
Donegal inter-county Gaelic footballers
Gaelic football forwards
Irish plasterers